The spottedsail barb, dwarf barb, phutuni barb, or pygmy barb (Pethia phutunio) is a tropical freshwater fish belonging to the subfamily Cyprininae of the family Cyprinidae. It originates in inland waters in Asia, and is found in Pakistan, India, Bangladesh, and Myanmar.

The fish will grow in length up to 3.1 inches (8 centimeters). It is a silvery fish, with three blotches on the body. An additional dark spot on the gill plate is not black, but translucent, exposing the pink of the gills. Fins are pale orange, slightly darker in the male. Sexes are difficult to recognize, except that the female has a fuller body.

It natively inhabits clear or muddy streams, and rivers, as well as standing waters, with a silty bottom.   They live in a tropical climate in water with a temperature range of 72–75 °F (22–24 °C). It feeds on worms, benthic crustaceans, insects, and plant matter.

The spottedsail barb is of commercial importance in the aquarium trade industry.

The swamp barb is an open water, substrate egg-scatterer, and adults do not guard the eggs. It spawns near dawn between plants near the surface of the water. The name phutunio comes from a native name, pungti phutuni.

See also
 List of freshwater aquarium fish species

References 
 

Pethia
Fish described in 1822
Barbs (fish)